Uzun may refer to:

Places
 Uzun, Iran, a village in Zanjan Province, Iran
 Uzun, Tajikistan a Jamoat in Tajikistan
 Uzun, Uzbekistan, a village in Uzbekistan
 Uzun District in Uzbekistan
 Uzun, Kuqa, a town in Kuqa, Aksu Prefecture, Xinjiang Uyghur Autonomous Region, China

People
 Ahmet Uzun, Turkish Cypriot politician
 Mehmed Uzun (1953–2007), Turkish-Kurdish writer
 Salih Uzun (born 1970), Turkish politician